James Veitch is an English comedian. He has mostly been known for his interactions with the authors of scam emails (known as scam baiting) using slideshows and video effects. In September 2020, Veitch was the subject of more than a dozen allegations of rape and sexual assault.

Career 
Veitch worked as a film editor on the 2006 film Papa Joe and as a digital intermediate conform artist on the 2008 movie Middle of Nowhere. In 2009, Veitch adapted John Keats's writings into a play for Keats House.

Veitch's first solo comedy show, The Fundamental Interconnectedness of Everyone with an Internet Connection, was launched at Brighton Fringe in May 2014 as part of the arts industry showcase WINDOW. The show ran in August at the Edinburgh Festival Fringe. It concerned scam emails, Veitch's humorous responses to them, and the nature of the Internet. The show was described by the Sunday Herald as "Topically brilliant comedy. Tears-down-the-face funny", and by The Scotsman as containing "Near-constant belly laughs". His next Edinburgh Fringe show was Genius Bar in 2015. Veitch authored Dot Con: The Art of Scamming a Scammer in 2015. A Kirkus Reviews article praised that Veitch's "absurdist approach and enthusiasm for his work make for unpredictably funny reading".

He has made two appearances on the talk show Conan. Veitch recorded three TED talks in 2015 and 2016. One chronicles Veitch's encounter with a supermarket chain's marketing emails, and the other two are about scam emails. Veitch also presented the Mashable video series "Scamalot" on YouTube. A Pleasance Courtyard performance in 2015 received praise from The Independent's Alice Jones, who stated that "Veitch has found a nerdy niche with his comic lectures about modern technology". In 2018, he starred in the Melbourne International Comedy Festival (Allstars Supershow). Veitch was a guest presenter on the live trivia gameshow HQ Trivia. In 2019, Veitch was the host of that year's Britannia Awards. He hosts a humorous investigative journalism series on BBC Radio 4 called James Veitch's Contractual Obligation. In August 2020, his comedy special, James Veitch: Straight to VHS, was released on HBO Max.

On 1 September 2020, more than a dozen women who attended Sarah Lawrence College with Veitch came forward with allegations against him ranging from emotional abuse to rape. Veitch declined to comment on the allegations when contacted by Hollywood Reporter, "but a source close to him says he denies all allegations". HBO subsequently removed his comedy special from its streaming platform. Veitch was dropped by his agent and edited out of a Quibi show he was set to host. Though the BBC initially decided to retain Contractual Obligation on BBC Sounds, it was removed in early September.

Bibliography 
 James Veitch: Dot Con: The Art of Scamming a Scammer. 2015.

References

External links 
 
 

21st-century British comedians
Alumni of the University of Aberdeen
British male comedians
British theatre directors
Comedians from London
Living people
Place of birth missing (living people)
Sarah Lawrence College alumni
Year of birth missing (living people)